The 2014 Toray Pan Pacific Open was a women's tennis tournament played on outdoor hard courts. It was the 31st edition of the Toray Pan Pacific Open, and part of the Premier Series of the 2014 WTA Tour. It took place at the Ariake Coliseum in Tokyo, Japan, on 15–21 September 2014. Ana Ivanovic won the singles title.

Singles entrants

Seeds 

 1 Rankings as of 8 September 2014

Other entrants 
The following players received wildcards into the singles main draw:
  Belinda Bencic
  Kimiko Date-Krumm
  Sabine Lisicki

The following players received entry from the qualifying draw:
  Marina Erakovic
  Jarmila Gajdošová
  Daria Gavrilova
  Alla Kudryavtseva

Withdrawals 
Before the tournament
  Camila Giorgi → replaced by  Kirsten Flipkens 
  Flavia Pennetta → replaced by  Lauren Davis
  Andrea Petkovic → replaced by  Elina Svitolina

Doubles entrants

Seeds 

 1 Rankings as of 8 September 2014

Other entrants 
The following pairs received wildcards into the doubles main draw:
  Dominika Cibulková /  Kirsten Flipkens
  Yurika Sema /  Mari Tanaka

Champions

Singles 

  Ana Ivanovic def.  Caroline Wozniacki 6–2, 7–6(7–2)

Doubles 

  Cara Black /  Sania Mirza def.  Garbiñe Muguruza /  Carla Suárez Navarro 6–2, 7–5

External links 

 

2014 WTA Tour
2014
2014 in Japanese women's sport
September 2014 sports events in Japan
Pan
2014 Toray Pan Pacific Open